Mohit Bakaya is the controller of BBC Radio 4. He joined the BBC in 1993 and produced programmes such as Front Row and Night Waves before becoming the commissioning editor for factual in 2008.

He was appointed as controller of Radio 4 in 2019, replacing Gwyneth Williams.

References 

Year of birth missing (living people)
Living people
British radio producers
BBC Radio 4 controllers
BBC executives
British radio executives